WBGQ (100.7 FM) ("Q100.7") is a radio station broadcasting a Hot AC format, playing popular hits today. Branded as "Q100.7", the station serves the Lakeway Area of East Tennessee, including the cities of Morristown, Rogersville, Greeneville, Newport, Jefferson City.  The station can be heard in Hamblen, Jefferson, Greene, Cocke, Grainger, Claiborne, Hawkins, Hancock and Union counties. The station is currently owned by Cherokee Broadcasting.

External links
WBGQ official website

BGQ
BGQ